Air Commodore (retired) Ibrahim Dada was Administrator of Borno State, Nigeria from December 1993 to August 1996, during the military administration of General Sani Abacha.
He was a Group Captain when he was appointed governor.
A pragmatic man, he made his priority, the completion of all viable projects that his predecessors had started before considering any new projects.
In June 1999, he was required to retire, as were all other former military administrators.

In June 2009, President Umaru Yar'Adua appointed Dada to the board of the Nigerian Institute of Oil Palm Research.

References

Living people
Nigerian Muslims
Governors of Borno State
Palm oil production in Nigeria
Year of birth missing (living people)